Disability and Rehabilitation: Assistive Technology is a bimonthly peer-reviewed medical journal covering research on physical medicine and rehabilitation, including practice and policy aspects of the rehabilitation process. It was established in 2006 as an offshoot of Disability and Rehabilitation. The journal is published by Taylor and Francis Group and the editor-in-chief is Marcia J. Scherer (Institute for Matching Person & Technology).

External links 
 

English-language journals
Rehabilitation medicine journals
Bimonthly journals
Taylor & Francis academic journals
Publications established in 2006